Nealcidion brachiale is a species of beetle in the family Cerambycidae. It was described by Bates in 1872.

References

Nealcidion
Beetles described in 1872